Hryhorii Skovoroda, also Gregory Skovoroda or Grigory Skovoroda (Hryhorii Savych Skovoroda; , Grigory Savvich Skovoroda; 3 December 1722 – 9 November 1794) was a philosopher of Ukrainian Cossack origin who lived and worked in the Russian Empire. He was a poet, a teacher and a composer of liturgical music. His significant influence on his contemporaries and succeeding generations and his way of life were universally regarded as  Socratic, and he was often called a "Socrates". Skovoroda's work contributed to the cultural heritage both of modern-day Ukraine and of Russia, both countries claiming him as a native son.

Skovoroda wrote his texts in a mixture of three languages: Church Slavic,  Ukrainian, and Russian, with a large number of Western-Europeanisms, and quotations in Latin and Greek. Most of his surviving letters were written in Latin or Greek, but a small fraction used the variety of Russian of the educated class in Sloboda Ukraine, a result of long Russification but with many Ukrainianisms still evident.

He received his education at the  Collegium Mohileanum in Kiev (Kyiv in present-day Ukraine). Haunted by worldly and spiritual powers, the philosopher led the life of an itinerant thinker-beggar. In his tracts and dialogs, biblical problems overlap with those examined earlier by Plato and the Stoics. Skovoroda's first book was issued after his death in 1798 in Saint Petersburg. Skovoroda's complete works were published for the first time in Saint Petersburg in 1861. Before this edition many of his works existed only in manuscript form.

Life 

Skovoroda was born into a small-holder Ukrainian Registered Cossack family in the village of Chernukhi in Lubny Regiment, Cossack Hetmante (In 1708 the territory of Cossack Hetmanate was incorporated into the Kiev Governorate, but Cossack Hetmanate was not liquidated), Russian Empire (modern-day Poltava Oblast, Ukraine), in 1722. His mother, Pelageya Stepanovna Shang-Giray, was directly related to Şahin Giray and was of partial Crimean Tatar ancestry. He was a student at the Kiev Mogila Academy (1734–1741, 1744–1745, 1751–1753) but did not graduate. In 1741, at the age of 19 due to his uncle Ignatiy Poltavtsev he was taken from Kiev to sing in the imperial choir in Moscow and St. Petersburg returning to Kiev in 1744. He spent the period from 1745 to 1750 in the kingdom of Hungary and is thought to have traveled elsewhere in Europe during this period as well. In 1750 he returned to Kiev. From 1750 to 1751, he taught poetics in Pereiaslav. For most of the period from 1753 to 1759, Skovoroda was a tutor in the family of a landowner in Kovrai. From 1759 to 1769, with interruptions, he taught such subjects as poetry, syntax, Greek, and ethics at the Kharkоv Collegium (also called Kharkiv Collegium). After an attack on his course on ethics in 1769 he decided to abandon teaching.

Skovoroda is known as a composer of liturgical music, as well as a number of songs to his own texts. Of the latter, several have passed into the realm of Ukrainian folk music. Many of his philosophical songs known as "Skovorodskie psalmy" were often encountered in the repertoire of blind traveling folk musicians known as kobzars. He was described as a proficient player on the flute, torban and kobza.

In the final quarter of his life he traveled by foot through Sloboda Ukraine staying with various friends, both rich and poor, preferring not to remain in one place for too long. During this time he dedicated himself to individual hermit-like monastic life and study.

This last period was the time of his great philosophic works. In this period as well, but particularly earlier, he wrote poetry and letters in Church Slavonic language, Greek and Latin and did a number of translations from Latin into Russian.

Language 

There is much debate regarding the language Skovoroda used in his writings. Skovoroda used a form of written Ukrainian which differed somewhat from the vernacular Ukrainian. As a scholar studying in a religious institution that relied heavily on various forms of the Church-Slavonic language although the foundation of his written language was Ukrainian.

Apart from written Ukrainian, Skovoroda was known to have spoken and written in Greek, Latin, German and Hebrew. His poetry has been analysed for foreign non-Ukrainian elements. In an article about Skovoroda's language and style the Slavic linguist George Shevelov was able to deduce that apart from Ukrainian it contained 7.8% Russian, 7.7% non-Slavic, and 27.6% Church Slavonic vocabulary, and that the variant of Church Slavonic he used was the variety used in the Synodal Bible of 1751. Skovoroda's prose however had a higher content of non-Ukrainian vocabulary: 36.7% Church Slavonic, 4.7% other non-Slavonic European languages, and 9.7% Russian.

George Y. Shevelov wrote an overview intended to dispel unfounded generalizations and lay the groundwork for serious study of Skovoroda's language and style. Regarding the common myth of Skovoroda as a “people's philosopher," or ideologist of the peasantry, Shevelov said that he belonged to and was dependent on the circles of the educated class in Sloboda Ukraine. He noted that "the language of Skovoroda, minus its many biblical and ecclesiastical, political and personal features is, in its foundation, the Slobožanščyna variety of standard Russian as used by the educated", as attested by the small number of his extant personal letters that were not in Latin or Greek.

Dan Chopyk describes the written language characteristics of Skovoroda's fables as mixed: "His fables, written in a mixed Russian-Ukrainian-Church Slavonic language were, according to Gorkij and Tolstoy, very effective and, judging by the number of extant copies, were equally liked by gentry and commoners."

Death 

Three days before he died, he went to the house of one of his closest friends and told him he had come to stay permanently. Every day he left the house with a shovel, and it turned out that he spent three days digging his own grave. On the third day, he ate dinner, stood up and said, "my time has come." He went into the next room, lay down, and died. He requested the following epitaph to be placed on his tombstone:

He died on 9 November 1794 in the village called Ivanovka (today is known as Skovorodinovka, Zolochiv district, Kharkiv Oblast)

Tributes 

On 15 September 2006, Skovoroda's portrait was placed on the second largest banknote in circulation in Ukraine, the ₴500 note.

The Hryhoriy Skovoroda Institute of Philosophy, founded in 1946, operates under the auspicies of the National Academy of Science of Ukraine (until 1991 Academy of Sciences of the UkrSSR).

In the village of Skovorodynivka in Kharkiv oblast, Ukraine, a museum of Skovoroda was located. The museum was operating in a building dated back to the 18th century, on an estate where Skovoroda was buried. On the night of 6–7 May 2022 the building was destroyed with a direct Russian missile strike in the time the Russian invasion of Ukraine. The shell flew under the roof of the building, and a fire broke out. The fire engulfed the entire museum premises. As a result Skovoroda National Museum was destroyed together with the historical building. The museum collection was not damaged since it was moved as a precaution in case of a Russian Federation attack. Interestingly the statue of Skovoroda in the building remained standing surrounded by debris of the destroyed building.

On December 2nd, 2022, on the 300th anniversary of Skovoroda's birth, a monument to him was installed in Washington D.C. near the Ukraine House. It was created in 1992 by American sculptor Mark Rhodes who was inspired by Skovoroda's ideas.

Works 

Skovoroda's works during his life were not printed, which was very typical for the 18th century.  Hryhorii Skovoroda was highly educated in different languages, in particular, Latin, Greek, German. He could read religious literature in German and was influenced by German pietism. Brought up in a spirit of philosophical and religious studies, he became an opponent of church scholasticism and the spiritual dominance of the Orthodox Church. "Our kingdom is within us" he wrote "and to know God, you must know yourself...People should know God, like themselves, enough to see him in the world...Belief in God does not mean belief in his existence and therefore to give in to him and live according to His law... Sanctity of life lies in doing good to people."

Skovoroda taught that "all work is blessed by God", but distribution of wealth outside the circle of God called unforgivable sin. Skovoroda taught that the only task of philosophy was to seek the truth and to pursue it. But in terms of human life, this goal is unattainable, and human happiness lies in the fact that everything has to find the truth. This goal can go in different directions, and intolerance of those who think differently, has no justification. Similarly, religious intolerance does not find justification for eternal truth revealed to the world in different forms. In relation to himself he was entirely uncompromising and as a result he achieved complete harmony between his teaching and his life. He was very gentle and observant in relation to others.
It was only in 1798 that his "Narsisis or Know thyself" was published in the Russian Empire, but without the inclusion of his name. In 1806 the magazine "Zion Vyestnyk" under the editorship of Alexander Labzin printed some more of his works. Then in Moscow in 1837–1839 a few of his works were published under his name, and only in 1861 the first almost complete collection of his works was published. On the occasion of the 100th anniversary of the philosopher's death, in Kharkiv (Kharkov), the publication of the famous seventh volume of the Transactions of the Kharkov Historico-Philological Society (1894), edited by Dmitriy Bagaley (after 1918 also known as Dmytro Bahalii), contained the bulk of Skovoroda's oeuvre.
Here 16 of his works were published, 9 of which appeared for the first time. Also published here was his biography and some of his poems. A full academic collection of all known works by Skovoroda was published in 2011 by Leonid Ushkalov.

List of works 
 Skovoroda, Hryhorii S. Fables and Aphorisms. Translation, biography, and analysis by Dan B. Chopyk (New York: Peter Lang, 1990) Review: Wolodymyr T. Zyla, Ukrainian Quarterly, 50 (1994): 303–304.
 Skovoroda, Hryhorii (Gregory), Piznay v sobi ludynu. Translated by M. Kashuba with an introduction by Vasyl' Voitovych (L'viv: S$vit, 1995) Selected works (original: Ukrainian language).
 Skovoroda, Hryhorii (Gregory), Tvory: V dvokh tomakh, foreword by O. Myshanych, chief editor Omelian Pritsak (Kiev: Oberehy, 1994) (original: Ukrainian language, translated from other languages).
 Skovoroda, Hryhorii (Gregory), "A Conversation Among Five Travelers Concerning Life's True Happiness" (Translated into English by George L. Kline).
 Skovoroda, Hryhorii (Gregory), "Conversation about the ancient world".
 Skovoroda, Hryhorii (Gregory), Ed. by Leonid Ushkalov. "Григорій Сковорода: повна академічна збірка творів" ("Grigory Skovoroda: a full academic collections of works"), (2011).

Teaching 

One of Skovoroda's missions was teaching. Formally he taught poetics in the Pereyaslav Collegium (during 1750–1751) and poetics, syntax, Greek and catechism at Kharkov Collegium (also called Kharkiv Collegium and in Latin: Collegium Charkoviensis or Zacharpolis Collegium) (during 1759–1760, 1761–1764, 1768–1769).

In 1751 he had a dispute with the presiding bishop of Pereyaslav Collegium who considered Skovoroda's new ways of teaching as strange and incompatible with the former traditional course of poetics. Young Skovoroda, confident in his mastery of the subject matter and in the precision, clarity and comprehensiveness of his rules of prosody, refused to comply with the bishop's order, asking for arbitration and pointing out to him that "alia res sceptrum, alia plectrum" [the pastor's scepter is one thing, but the flute is another]. The bishop considered Skovoroda's stance as arrogant and consequently he was dismissed.

The first year of teaching at Kharkov Collegium passed brilliantly for Skovoroda. He not only excited his students with his lectures but his creative pedagogical approach also attracted the attention of his colleagues and even his superiors.

Skovoroda was also a private tutor for Vasily Tomara (1740—1813) (during 1753–1754, 1755–1758) and a mentor as well as a lifelong friend of Michael Kovalinsky (or Kovalensky, 1745–1807) (during 1761–1769), his biographer. Probably he was also a private tutor for Gabriel Vishnevsky (1716—1752) (during 1745–1749), son of Fyodor Vishnevsky (1682—1749). Due to Fyodor Vishnevsky, Skovoroda has visited Central Europe, especially Hungary and Austria.

In his teaching Skovoroda aimed at discovering the student's inclinations and abilities and devised talks and readings which would develop them to the fullest. This approach has been described by Skovoroda's biographer Kovalinsky:
"Skovoroda began [teaching young] Vasily Tomara by working more on the heart of his young disciple and, watching for his natural inclinations, he tried to help only the nature itself in developing him by engaging, light, and tender direction which the boy could not even notice, for Skovoroda paid particular attention not to overtax the young mind with [heavy] learning. In this way the boy became attached to Skovoroda with love [and trust for] him."

His teaching was not limited to academia nor to private friends and during his later years as a "wanderer" he taught publicly the many who were drawn to him. Archimandrite Gavriil (Vasily Voskresensky, 1795–1868), the first known historian of Russian philosophy, brilliantly described Skovoroda's Socratic qualities in teaching:
"Both Socrates and Skovoroda felt from above the calling to be tutors of the people, and, accepting the calling, they became public teachers in the personal and elevated meaning of that word. … Skovoroda, also like Socrates, not being limited by time or place, taught on the crossroads, at markets, by a cemetery, under church porticoes, during holidays, when his sharp word would articulate an intoxicated will - and in the hard days of the harvest, when a rainless sweat poured upon the earth."

Skovoroda taught that one finds his true calling by self-examination. "Know yourself," advises Skovoroda using the well known maxim of the Greek philosopher Socrates. He introduced a well founded idea that a person engaged in an in-born, natural work is provided with a truly satisfying and happy life.

The education of young people occupied the attention of Skovoroda until his old age. In 1787, seven years before his death, Skovoroda wrote two essays,  The Noble Stork (in Original: Благодарный Еродій, Blagorodnyj Erodiy) and The Poor Lark (in Original: Убогій Жаворонокъ, Ubogiy Zhavoronok), devoted to the theme of education where he expounded his ideas.

Skovoroda's broad influence is reflected by the famous writers that appreciated his teachings: Vladimir Solovyov, Leo Tolstoy, Maxim Gorky, Andrei Bely, Taras Shevchenko and Ivan Franko.

References

Sources
Fuhrmann J.T. The First Russian Philosopher's Search for the Kingdom of God // Essays on Russian Intellectual History / Ed. by L.B. Blair. – Austin: University of Texas Press, 1971. – P. 33–72.
Schultze B. Grigorij Savvič Skovoroda // Schultze B. Russische Denker: ihre Stellung zu Christus, Kirche und Papstum. – Wien: Thomas-Moraus-Presse im Verlag Herder, 1950. – S. 15–27.}Busch W. Grigorij Skovoroda // Busch W. Horaz in Russland. Studien und Materialien. – München: Eidos Verlag, 1964. – S. 66–70.}
Ueberweg, Friedrich. Die Philosophie des Auslandes. Berlin, 1928. S. 336 ff.}
Arseniew N. (von) Bilder aus dem russischen Geistesleben. I. Die mystische Philosophie Skovorodas // Kyrios. Vierteljahresschrift für Kirchen- und Geistesgeschichte Osteuropas / Hrsg. von H. Koch. – Königsberg; Berlin: Ost-Europa-Verlag, 1936. – Bd. I. – Hft. 1. – S. 3–28.}
Jakovenko B. Filosofi russi: saggio di storia della filosofia russa. – Firenze: La Voce, 1925. – XI, 242 р.}
 Сковорода Григорий Саввич // Энциклопедия Кругосвет}
 Сковорода Григорий Саввич // Энциклопедия Кольера. – М.: Открытое общество, 2000.
Марченко О. В. Сковорода Григорий Саввич // Русская философия. Малый энциклопедический словарь. – М., 1995. – С. 469–474.}
Zenkovsky V.V. G.S. Skovoroda // Zenkovsky V.V. A History of Russian Philosophy / Transl. by George L. Kline. – New York: Columbia University Press, 1953; London: Routledge and Kegan Paul, 1953. – Vol. 1. – P. 53–69.}
Goerdt, Wilhelm. Russische Philosophie: Zugänge und Durchblicke. — Freiburg: Verlag Karl Arber, 1984). Также см.: Studies in Soviet Thought 30 (1985) 73.}
Genyk-Berezovská Z. Skovorodův odkaz (Hryhorij Skovoroda a ruská literatura) // Bulletin ruského jazyka a literatury. – 1993. – S. 111–123.}
Piovesana G.K. G.S. Skovoroda (1722–1794) primo filosofo ucraino-russo // Orientalia Christiana Periodica. – Roma, 1989. – Vol. LV. – Fasc. 1. – P. 169–196.Болдырев А.И. Проблема человека в русской философии XVIII века. – Москва: Издательство Московского университета, 1986. – 120 с.}
Вышеславцев Б. П. Этика преображённого Эроса / Вступ. ст., сост. и коммент. В. В. Сапова. – М.:Республика, 1994. – 368 с. – (Б-ка этической мысли).  (С. 155)}
 Лосев А. Ф. Г. С. Сковорода в истории русской культуры // Лосевские чтения. Материалы научно-теоретической конференции ..., Ростов-на-Дону, 2003, с. 3–8.}
Флоровский Г. В., прот. Пути русского богословия. – Paris: YMCA Press, 1937. – VI, 574 с.}
Lo Gatto E. L'idea filosofico-religiosa russa da Skovorodà a Solovjòv // Bilychnis: Rivista di studi religiosi. – 1927. – Vol. XXX. – Р. 77–90.}Шпет Г. Г. Очерк развития русской философии. – Петроград: Колос, 1922. – Ч. 1. – C. 68–83.}
Эрн В. Ф. Григорий Саввич Сковорода. Жизнь и учение. – Москва: Путь, 1912. – 343 с.}Эрн В. Ф. Русский Сократ // Северное сияние. 1908. No. 1. С. 59–69.}
Schmid, Ulrich. Russische Religionsphilosophie des 20. Jh. Freiburg, Basel, Wien: Herder, 2003. S. 9–10, 220, 234.}
Onasch, Konrad.  Grundzüge der russischen Kirchengeschichte at Google Books (Czech) // Göttingen: Hubert & Co, 1967). vol. 3. — S. 110.

Further reading 
 Dytyniak Maria Ukrainian Composers – A Bio-bibliographic Guide – Research report No. 14, 1896, Canadian Institute of Ukrainian Studies, University of Alberta, Canada.
 Ern, Vladimir F. Григорий Саввич Сковорода. Жизнь и учение (Moscow: Путь, 1912)
 Gustafson, Richard F. "Tolstoy's Skovoroda." Journal of Ukrainian Studies 22, no. 1/2 (1997): 87.
 Marshall, Richard H. Jr., and Bird, Thomas E. (eds.) Hryhorij Skovoroda: an anthology of critical articles (Edmonton: Canadian Institute of Ukrainian Studies, 1994)
 Perri, Giuseppe. "The Prologue to the Narcissus of Hryhorii Skovoroda as a Philosophical Testament." (2015).
 Pylypiuk, Natalia. ‘The Primary Door: at the threshold of Skovoroda’s theology and poetics’, Harvard Ukrainian Studies, 14(3–4), 1990, pp551–583
 Zakydalsky, Taras, "The Theory of Man in the Philosophy of Skovoroda" (1965)
 Naydan, Michael M. (ed.) 'Special issue on Hryhorii Skovoroda', Journal of Ukrainian Studies, 22 (1–2), 1997
 Scherer, Stephen. "Structure, symbol and style in Hryhorii Skovoroda's" Potop Zmin"." East European Quarterly 32, no. 3 (1998): 409–429.
 Shreyer-Tkachenko O. Hryhoriy Skovoroda – muzykant., Kiev, 1971
 "The world tried to catch him but failed — Hryhoriy Skovoroda, the 18th-century Ukrainian philosopher", Welcome to Ukraine, 2003, 1
The Garden of Divine Songs and Collected Poetry of Hryhory Skovoroda. Hryhory Skovoroda, Translated in English by Michael M. Naydan. (Glagoslav Publications, 2016) 
The Complete Correspondence of Hryhory Skovoroda – Philosopher And Poet. In English (Glagoslav Publications, 2016) 
 Shubin, Daniel H. Skovoroda: The World Tried to Catch me but could Not,   Biography with some original translation of his philosophic compositions.

External links

 
 Online concordance

1722 births
1794 deaths
People from Poltava Oblast
People from Kiev Governorate (1708–1764)
People from the Cossack Hetmanate
Eastern Orthodox mystics
Enlightenment philosophers
Ukrainian composers
Ukrainian philosophers
Ukrainian writers
Russian composers
Russian male composers
Russian philosophers
Russian writers
Eastern Orthodox philosophers
Ukrainian male writers
Russian male writers
18th-century composers
18th-century male musicians
18th-century Christian mystics
Ukrainian people of Crimean Tatar descent
Ukrainian  classical composers